Chonaphini is a tribe of flat-backed millipedes in the family Xystodesmidae. There are about 6 genera and 19 described species in Chonaphini.

Genera
These six genera belong to the tribe Chonaphini:
 Chonaphe Cook, 1904
 Metaxycheir Buckett & Gardner, 1969
 Montaphe Chamberlin, 1949
 Selenocheir Shelley, 1994
 Semionellus Chamberlin, 1920
 Tubaphe Causey, 1954

References

Further reading

 
 
 
 
 

Polydesmida
Articles created by Qbugbot
Arthropod tribes